The Anterior surface can refer (among other things) the following:

 Anterior surface of pancreas
 Anterior surface of cervical vertebrae